Ayyapuram is an area in Palakkad city,Kerala, India. The area derives its name from the Ayyappan temple that is located nearby. History is that the whole area belonged to this temple.Ayyapuram is wards 4 and 15 of Palakkad Municipality.

There are 3 temples in this area. One Ayyappan temple, one Panchali (Draupadi) amman temple and one Mariyamman temple.
A temple for Panchali is a rarity.

There is a colony nearby which has also been named after Lord Ayyappa - Sasthapuri, where some 35 houses have been built and some 150 people live.

References

Villages in Palakkad district
Suburbs of Palakkad
Cities and towns in Palakkad district